The Yellow Stain is a 1922 silent drama film released by Fox Film Corporation. The film stars John Gilbert and Claire Anderson. It is not known whether the film currently survives.

Plot
Donald Keith is a lawyer who has recently moved to a fictional logging community in Northern Michigan. He later learns that Quartus Hembly, the town boss, has illegally conned a man named Daniel Kersten out of his property, ruining him and turning him into the town drunkard. Keith decides to help Kersten take legal action against Hembly and bring him to justice. Keith eventually succeeds and also causes the town's residents to rise up against Hembly.

Cast
John Gilbert as Donald Keith
Claire Anderson as Thora Erickson
Mark Fenton as Olaf Erickson
John P. Lockney as Quartus Hembly
Herschel Mayall as Dr. Brown
William Robert Daly as Daniel Kersten

References

External links

1922 films
American black-and-white films
Silent American drama films
1922 drama films
American silent feature films
Films directed by John Francis Dillon
1920s American films